Ruy Barbosa de Oliveira (5 November 1849 – 1 March 1923), also known as Rui Barbosa, was a Brazilian polymath, diplomat, writer, jurist, and politician. Born in Salvador, Bahia, and a distinguished and staunch defender of civil liberties and the abolition of slavery in Brazil, Barbosa would go on to represent Brazil in the second Hague convention, argued for Brazil's participation in World War I on the side of the Allies, and personally ordered the destruction of all government records pertaining to slavery while he was Minister of Finance. He was forced into exile during the presidency of Floriano Peixoto, as his economic policies while he was finance minister paved the way for a disaster in the Brazilian economy. After exile, Barbosa would run an extremely memorable campaign for the presidency, though ultimately failed.

Early life 
Rui Barbosa gave his first public speech for the abolition of slavery when he was 19. For the rest of his life he remained an uncompromising defender of civil liberties. Slavery in Brazil was finally abolished by the Lei Áurea ("Golden Law") in 1888. Part of Barbosa's legacy to history is that he authorised, as Minister of Finance on 14 December 1890, the destruction of most government records relating to slavery. The avowed reason for this destruction, which took several years to be enacted and was followed by his successors, was to erase the "stain" of slavery on Brazilian history. However, historians today agree that Barbosa aimed to prevent any possible indemnification of the former slave-owners for this liberation. Indeed, eleven days after the abolition of slavery, a law project was deposed at the Chamber, proposing some indemnification to the slave owners.

Political career

Political stances 

Barbosa's liberal ideas were influential in drafting of the first republican constitution. He was a supporter of fiat money, as opposed to a gold standard, in Brazil. During his term as finance secretary, he implemented far-reaching reforms of Brazil's financial regime, instituting a vigorously expansionist monetary policy. The result was chaos and instability: the so-called fiat experiment resulted in the bubble of encilhamento, a dismal politic-economic failure. Due to his controversial role during it, in the following administration of Floriano Peixoto, he was forced into exile until Floriano's term ended. Years later, after his return he was elected as a Senator. He headed the Brazilian delegation to the 2nd Hague Conference and was brilliant in its deliberations. As candidate of the Civilian Party in the presidential election of 1910, Barbosa waged one of the most memorable campaigns in Brazilian politics. He was not successful and lost to Marshal Hermes da Fonseca. He ran again in the elections of 1914 and 1919, both times losing to the government candidate.

During World War I, he played a key role among those who advocated the Allied cause, arguing that Brazil should be more involved in the war. Barbosa died in Petrópolis, near Rio de Janeiro, in 1923.

See also
Oração aos moços

Notes

Bibliography
 , originally by Abingdon-Cokesbury Press.

External links

 .
 .
 
 

1849 births
1923 deaths
Brazilian people of Portuguese descent
19th-century Brazilian lawyers
Brazilian male writers
Brazilian diplomats
Translators to Portuguese
Members of the Brazilian Academy of Letters
Brazilian abolitionists
Permanent Court of International Justice judges
People from Salvador, Bahia
Members of the Federal Senate (Brazil)
Finance Ministers of Brazil
Candidates for President of Brazil
Ministers of Justice of Brazil
Brazilian judges of international courts and tribunals